"The Ballad of Oz" is a song by the Australian group, Daddy Cool, released in August 1994 as a double-A sided single with "Happy Hippy Hut" by Skyhooks. The single peaked at number 35 on the ARIA Charts, remaining in that position for three consecutive weeks.

Background and release
In 1994, Skyhooks and Daddy Cool briefly reformed in a proposed 1994 stadium tour and together released a double-A sided single. The tour was ultimately downgraded to the pub circuit.

Track listing

Charts

References

1994 singles
Mushroom Records singles
1994 songs
Songs written by Ross Wilson (musician)
Daddy Cool (band) songs